Vincent Adler (3 April 1826, Győr – 4 January 1871, Geneva) was a Hungarian composer and pianist.

Adler received his initial musical training from his brother-in-law Ferenc Erkel and later studied in Vienna, before finally settling in Paris. From Paris, he embarked on numerous concert tours of Europe as a soloist. In 1864, he started teaching at the Geneva Conservatory.

Adler composed many études and virtuosic salon pieces for the piano, which were filled with Hungarian colour.

References
Magyar Zsidó Lexikon (Dictionary of Hungarian Jewry), Budapest 1929, pp.17-18.

1826 births
1871 deaths
19th-century classical composers
19th-century classical pianists
19th-century Hungarian male musicians
Hungarian classical composers
Hungarian classical pianists
Male classical pianists
19th-century Hungarian Jews
Hungarian male classical composers
Hungarian Romantic composers
People from Győr